Mike Sands (born April 6, 1963) is a Canadian former professional ice hockey goaltender who played six games in the National Hockey League with the Minnesota North Stars between 1984 and 1986. The rest of his career, which lasted from 1982 to 1989, was spent in the minor leagues.

Early life
Sands was born in Mississauga, Ontario. As a youth, he played in the 1976 Quebec International Pee-Wee Hockey Tournament with a minor ice hockey team from Mississauga.

Career 
During his NHL career, Sands played for the Minnesota North Stars. He has since worked as an amateur scount for the Arizona Coyotes. He previously worked as director of amateur scouting for the Calgary Flames and for the NHL Central Scouting Bureau.

Career statistics

Regular season and playoffs

International

References

External links
 

1963 births
Living people
Arizona Coyotes scouts
Baltimore Skipjacks players
Birmingham South Stars players
Calgary Flames scouts
Canadian ice hockey goaltenders
Ice hockey people from Ontario
Kalamazoo Wings (1974–2000) players
Minnesota North Stars draft picks
Minnesota North Stars players
Nashville South Stars players
Salt Lake Golden Eagles (CHL) players
Sportspeople from Mississauga
Springfield Indians players
Sudbury Wolves players